Euphorbia × martini, or Martin’s spurge, is a hybrid between two species of flowering plant, E. amygdaloides × E. characias subsp. characias
in the spurge family Euphorbiaceae. It was found growing wild in southern France. It is useful as a spreading, weed-smothering groundcover.

All parts of the plant are toxic if eaten, moreover euphorbias produce an irritant milky sap when cut or broken.

Numerous cultivars have been developed for garden use, of which the following have gained the Royal Horticultural Society’s Award of Garden Merit:-
’Ascot Rainbow’
 ‘Helen Robinson’

References

Plant nothospecies
Flora of France
martini